Thyenula tenebrica is a jumping spider species in the genus Thyenula that lives in South Africa. Only the female has been described.

References

Endemic fauna of South Africa
Salticidae
Spiders described in 2014
Spiders of South Africa